Witch Doctor is a 2016 Chinese-Thai horror suspense thriller film directed by Wu Zongqiang and starring Treechada Petcharat, Patrick Tam, Lu Yulai and Meng Yao. It was released in China by Iqiyi Pictures on May 27, 2016.

Plot

Cast
Treechada Petcharat
Patrick Tam
Lu Yulai
Meng Yao
Gao Yalin
Zhang Bu

Reception
The film has grossed  at the Chinese box office.

References

External links

Chinese horror thriller films
Thai horror thriller films
2016 horror films
2016 horror thriller films